Janhvi Kapoor (born 6 March 1997) is an Indian actress who works in Hindi films. Born to Sridevi and Boney Kapoor, she made her acting debut in 2018 with the romantic drama Dhadak, which was a commercial success. Kapoor received a nomination for the Filmfare Award for Best Actress for playing the titular aviator in the biopic Gunjan Saxena: The Kargil Girl (2020). She has since starred in the 2022 streaming films Good Luck Jerry and Mili.

Early life and background 
Janhvi Kapoor was born on 6 March 1997. Her father is Boney Kapoor, the son of the late filmmaker Surinder Kapoor, and the founder of the Anil Kapoor Films Company. Her mother is actress Sridevi who worked in Telugu, Tamil and Hindi films. She is the niece of film actors Anil Kapoor and Sanjay Kapoor. She has one younger sister, Khushi, and two half siblings, actor Arjun Kapoor and Anshula Kapoor from her father's first marriage. Kapoor lost her mother at age 21, when she was found dead of an accidental drowning in her guest room at the Jumeirah Emirates Towers Hotel, in Dubai, United Arab Emirates.

Kapoor studied at Ecole Mondiale World School in Mumbai. Before making her film debut, she took an acting course from Lee Strasberg Theatre and Film Institute in California.

Career 

Kapoor made her acting debut in 2018 with the Shashank Khaitan-directed romance Dhadak, co-starring Ishaan Khatter.  A Hindi-language remake of the 2016 Marathi film Sairat, it featured her as a young upper-class girl whose life turns tragic after she elopes with a lower-class boy (played by Khatter). The film received predominantly negative reviews, but with a worldwide collection of 1.1 billion, it proved to be a commercial success. Writing for News18, Rajeev Masand criticised the film for removing caste-based references and deemed it inferior to the original, but felt Kapoor had "a fragility that makes her instantly endearing, and a soulful quality that makes it hard to take your eyes off her on screen". Conversely, Anna M. M. Vetticad of Firstpost thought that she "lacks personality and delivers a colourless performance". She won the Zee Cine Award for Best Female Debut.

Kapoor's next screen appearance came in 2020 when she starred in Zoya Akhtar's segment in the Netflix horror anthology film Ghost Stories. Shubhra Gupta of The Indian Express disliked the segments but added that the "only real surprise comes from Janhvi Kapoor in a solid, real act". She then took on the titular role of aviator Gunjan Saxena in the biopic Gunjan Saxena: The Kargil Girl, which due to the COVID-19 pandemic could not be released theatrically and instead streamed on Netflix. In preparation, she spent time with Saxena, underwent physical training, and learned the body language of an air force officer. Saibal Chatterjee of NDTV described Kapoor's performance as "passably steady" while Rahul Desai of Film Companion was more appreciative of her "deceptively private performance" which he considered to be "pitch-perfect". She received a nomination for the Filmfare Award for Best Actress for her performance.

In 2021, Kapoor played a dual role opposite Rajkummar Rao in the comedy horror film Roohi. The film was theatrically released after several delays due to the second wave of the COVID-19 pandemic. The film and Kapoor's performance received poor reviews from critics, and it performed poorly at the box-office. The following year, Kapoor starred in Good Luck Jerry, a remake of the 2018 Tamil film Kolamaavu Kokila, produced by Aanand L. Rai. It was released on the streaming platform Disney+ Hotstar. In her next film, Mili, a remake of the Malayalam film Helen, she played a young woman trapped in a freezer, which was played by Anna Ben in the original. Anupama Chopra was appreciative of the "sweetness and sincerity" she brought to the part but considered it much less accomplished than Ben's performance.

Kapoor will next star in the sports film Mr and Mrs Mahi with Rajkummar Rao and the action film Bawaal with Varun Dhawan.

Media image 

Kapoor has appeared as brand ambassador for the cosmetics brand Nykaa and for Drools, a pet food brand.

Kapoor frequently featured in the Times Of India's list of most desirable women, ranked 28th in 2018, 24th in 2019, and 18th in 2020.

Filmography

Films

Music video

Awards and nominations

References

External links 

 
 

1997 births
21st-century Indian actresses
Actresses from Mumbai
Actresses in Hindi cinema
Indian film actresses
Indian Tamil people
Living people
Punjabi people
Zee Cine Awards winners